Besla subrugata is a species of sea snail, a marine gastropod mollusk in the family Pyramidellidae, the pyrams and their allies. The species is one of twelve known species within the Besla genus of gastropods.

Distribution

This marine species is distributed throughout marine terrain off the coasts of New Zealand, within the New Zealand Exclusive Economic Zone.

References

External links
 To World Register of Marine Species

Pyramidellidae
Gastropods described in 1927